In Māori tradition, Te Kōhatuwhenua was one of the great ocean-going, voyaging canoes that was used in the migrations that settled New Zealand. Taranaki iwi Ngāti Ruanui and Ngā Rauru trace their ancestry back to Taikehu, the captain of Te Kōhatuwhenua.

See also
List of Māori waka

References

Māori waka
Māori mythology